The Admiraal Tjerk Hiddes de Vries was a Dutch 68-gun third rate ship of the line of the navy of the Admiralty of Friesland, one of five provincial naval forces of the United Republic of the Netherlands' In 1795, following the French occupation of the Netherlands, this ship (like all other Dutch Warships) was taken over by the Batavian Republic, and in 1797 was captured by the Royal Navy. 
The order to construct the ship was given by the Admiralty of Friesland.
In 1783 the Admiraal Tjerk Hiddes de Vries sailed to the Mediterranean Sea under Captain Van der Beets. When she returned in the Dutch Republic she was laid up in ordinary until 1795.

In 1795, the ship was commissioned in the Batavian Navy.

On 11 October 1797 the Admiraal Tjerk Hiddes de Vries took part in the Battle of Camperdown under Captain J.B. Zeegers. The ship was captured by the British.

The ship was renamed HMS Admiral DeVries, and in 1799 she served as a transport ship. In that year she sailed to the West Indies. She sprang a leak off San Domingo and was determined to be unfit for sea. She served as a prison hulk in Port Royal until she was sold in 1806.

References

Ships of the line of the Dutch Republic
Ships of the line of the Batavian Republic
Ships of the line of the Royal Navy
Captured ships
Ships built in the Netherlands
1782 ships
Maritime incidents in 1797